Cedric Myron Benson (December 28, 1982 – August 17, 2019) was an American professional football player who was a running back in the National Football League (NFL). He played college football for the Texas Longhorns and was recognized as a consensus All-American. He was selected by the Chicago Bears with the fourth overall pick in the 2005 NFL Draft and also played for the Cincinnati Bengals and Green Bay Packers.

Early life
Benson began to emerge as a football stand-out in the eighth grade while attending Abell Junior High School in Midland, Texas, under Coach Chris McKinney. Benson attended Robert E. Lee High School in Midland, Texas, and finished his high school playing career with 8,423 rushing yards (the most in Texas 5A history, largest classification at the time, and the fourth most in Texas high school football history). He led his team to three consecutive State Championships, and rushed for a total of 15 touchdowns in the three championship games. Benson rushed for more than 1,900 yards in only 9 games. He rushed for over 3,500 yards (51 touchdowns) his junior year in an undefeated State and National Championship season. He was the first high school player ever to make the cover of Dave Campbell's Texas Football annual magazine. Benson was also a center fielder on the baseball team. As a senior, in District 4-5A games, he hit .361 with 4 home runs and 14 RBIs.

College career
Benson attended the University of Texas at Austin, where he was a four-year starter for the Longhorns football team. As a senior in 2004, he received the Doak Walker Award as the nation's top running back and was recognized as a consensus All-American. He finished his college career with 5,540 rushing yards to rank tenth all time in NCAA Division I-A history, and second only to Ricky Williams in Longhorns team history.

He has often been compared to Williams, due to their similarities in running style, college choice, legal complications, and superficial appearance (roughly the same size and build coming out of college, and both had dreadlocks early in their careers), and the fact that they had both been minor league baseball players.

While attending the University of Texas, Benson majored in social work and sociology. During his latter years, he earned membership into the Texas' Athletics Director's Academic Honor Roll, and the Big 12 Commissioner's Honor Roll in fall of 2003. Also, while in college, Benson was arrested twice, once for possession of marijuana and the other for criminal trespass. The marijuana case was dropped after a friend came forward and claimed ownership. He received 8 days in jail for the trespass conviction although he spent no time in jail other than the day of arrest due to overcrowding in Travis County Jail. He was forced to serve a one-half game suspension against Baylor University.

College statistics

Professional football career

Chicago Bears

The Chicago Bears selected Benson with the fourth overall pick in the 2005 NFL Draft. Benson was visibly upset upon being drafted by Chicago, as the two parties disagreed on contract terms prior to the draft. After a 36-day contract hold-out, Benson and the Bears finally agreed to a five-year contract worth $35 million, with a $16 million signing bonus. The Bears wished to make Benson their feature running back, but his lengthy contract impasse had caused him to miss the team's entire training camp. Benson claimed that he received a cold reception upon his return because he claimed he would be starting by the third game despite holding out and not practicing. Jay Glazer reported that certain players even attempted to intentionally injure him during practice.

The team temporarily made Thomas Jones their featured running back for the beginning of the 2005 season. Jones' performance impressed the Bears' coaching staff, and earned him the top spot on the team's depth-chart for the next two seasons. Benson occasionally received playtime, and he rushed for eighty yards on sixteen carries against the New Orleans Saints during his best game. However, shortly afterwards, he suffered a medial collateral ligament sprain and missed most of the remaining season.

After the 2005 the Bears considered making Benson the team's starting running back after Jones was unhappy with his current contract status. The team's plans went astray when Benson injured his shoulder after colliding with Brian Urlacher during a routine scrimmage. Although the injury was not serious, it placed Benson on the sidelines for a majority of the preseason.

Although Benson fully recovered from his injury, head coach Lovie Smith selected Jones as the Bears' starter. Benson scored his first two touchdowns during week five of the 2006 season, against the Buffalo Bills. In a game against the New England Patriots during week twelve of the season, Benson collided with linebacker Junior Seau, causing Seau to fall down and fracture his forearm.

Days later, Benson challenged Smith's coaching by remarking, "the NFL is not like high school or college, but the best players don't always get on the field." The following week, Benson out rushed Jones and scored a vital touchdown against the Minnesota Vikings on 4th down. However, when asked about it after the game, he said he didn't know that it was 4th down. He began to receive more carries as the weeks progressed, and managed to rush for over 100 yards against the Green Bay Packers.

Benson became the Bears' secondary running back again during the playoffs. In the 2006 NFC Championship game against the New Orleans Saints, Benson scored a fourth-quarter touchdown and totaled 60 yards. Though he was given a majority of the team's carries, his counterpart, Jones, amassed two touchdowns and 123 rushing yards. In the team's following game, Super Bowl XLI, Benson sustained a knee injury in the first half, and missed the remainder of the game.

Smith named Benson as the Bears' starting running back after the team traded Jones to the New York Jets. Benson struggled throughout the preseason, but received enough support from his teammates and coaches to retain his starting position. He amassed only forty-two yards in his first regular season game and committed a costly turnover. However, Benson rebounded with a 101-yard performance during his next start. After several inconsistent games, Benson began to stabilize after the bye week. In one of his best games of the season, Benson rushed for eighty-nine yards and scored one touchdown on eleven attempts. He averaged 5.8 yards in his next game, but sustained a season-ending ankle injury. Benson, who had amassed 647 yards and four touchdowns, was eventually relieved by Adrian N. Peterson.

Jerry Angelo, the Bears' general manager, had expressed interest in acquiring a new running back to revitalize the Bears' running game, which finished last in yards in the league. Upon hearing the news, Benson commented, “You all know the competition that goes on around here. It doesn’t matter to me. Maybe somebody else can get some criticism.” On June 9, 2008, Benson was released by the Bears following his second alcohol-related arrest in five weeks.

In October 2009, Benson confirmed that shortly before he was released by the Bears, he had been diagnosed with Celiac disease.
 In September 2016, Benson stated that "no year in Chicago was I happy.".

Cincinnati Bengals
Shortly after the grand jury failed to indict him on both incidents in Austin, Benson signed a one-year, $520,000 contract with the Cincinnati Bengals on September 30, 2008. DeDe Dorsey was placed on injured reserve and Chris Perry was the starter. Benson's season began in a loss to the Dallas Cowboys, rushing 10 times for 30 yards. He became the starting back for the Bengals in Week 7 against the Pittsburgh Steelers. Benson rushed 14 times for 52 yards in his first career start as a Bengal. In the following 35–6 loss to the Houston Texans, he totaled 49 yards on 13 carries and had two receptions for 20 yards. The Bengals picked up their first victory of the season in a 21–19 game against the Jacksonville Jaguars, with Benson carrying 24 times for 104 yards and a touchdown. Benson hit his stride in the Bengals' three-game winning streak at the end of the season, gashing the Washington Redskins in week 15 with 161 yards from scrimmage, including 88 yards receiving (79 of which came on a screen pass). In week 16, Benson dominated the Cleveland Browns, rushing for 171 yards. In the final game of the season against the Kansas City Chiefs, Benson had 111 yards on 25 carries. In the twelve games he was active during the 2008 season, Benson had 932 yards from scrimmage: 747 rushing and 185 receiving.

A free agent after the 2008 season, Benson visited with the Houston Texans before signing a two-year, $7-million contract with the Bengals on March 3, 2009.

Entering week 8 of the 2009 season, Benson had 164 carries for an NFL best 720 yards (4.4 per carry average). In week 5, he became the first 100-yard rusher against the Baltimore Ravens in 40 games, when he rushed for 120 yards and a touchdown. In week 7, Benson faced his former team, the Chicago Bears, and rushed for a career-high 189 yards and a touchdown.

Benson went on to record his first 1,000-yard rushing season and he set a Bengals franchise record with six games with over 100 rushing yards. He finished the season as the NFL's 8th leading rusher with 1,251 yards, despite playing only 13 games. He then set a Bengals postseason record with 169 rushing yards in their 24–14 loss to the New York Jets.

The Bengals declined to resign Benson in 2012. Coach Marvin Lewis later recounted how he explained the decision to Benson: "'Ced, it's not that I didn't think you could do that on the football field, it was the other [stuff] that I got tired of. When I would go to you and say we're going to rotate the backs [and Benson would take it poorly]. I don't need that anymore.'"

Green Bay Packers
On August 12, 2012, Benson signed with the Green Bay Packers. The deal was reportedly a one-year contract worth $825,000.

On October 7, 2012, Benson suffered a Lisfranc injury to his foot and was later placed on injured reserve.

Professional baseball career
Benson was drafted by the Los Angeles Dodgers in the 12th round (370th overall) of the 2001 MLB Draft. While Benson did not play in the major leagues, he spent his time with the Dodgers playing in their summer league at Vero Beach. He also played with the Gulf Coast League Dodgers. In 25 at-bats he had 5 hits, 1 run, 3 doubles, 2 triples, and 2 RBIs.

NFL career  statistics

Personal life
Benson's cousin, Aaron, played linebacker for the University of Texas from 2010–2013, but gave up the sport in his redshirt senior year.

Benson had celiac disease and attributed his adoption of a gluten-free diet to giving him more energy.

After his NFL career, Benson became a loan originator.

Legal troubles

2008 arrests
Before the start of the 2008 season, Benson was arrested for allegedly operating a boat while intoxicated and resisting arrest. On May 3, 2008, the incident occurred near Austin, Texas, by the Lower Colorado River Authority during a late night safety inspection. The official police report cited that Benson had failed a field sobriety test, and became hostile towards the police. The officers arrested Benson, and proceeded to use pepper-spray after he forcefully resisted arrest. Benson was later detained for the night, and charged with boating while intoxicated and resisting arrest.
 
Benson later refuted the charges against him, and stated he requested to take a follow-up field sobriety test on land after failing the initial one. Benson had further accused the officers of abusing him, stating, “I’m not handcuffed. I’m not under arrest. I’m not threatening him. I’m not pushing him. I’m not touching him. And he sprays me right in the eye.” He also asserts that officers continuously struck his ankles and feet to prevent him from walking properly. A female passenger on Benson's boat also claimed to have witnessed the abuse and called her father out of fear for Benson's safety. Her fiancé, also on the boat, may have had dozens of pictures confirming Benson's account.

Upon hearing about the incident, Bears' head coach Lovie Smith stated, “I haven’t had a chance to speak with Cedric yet, but anytime we’re talking about one of our players getting arrested, you’re disappointed in it,” and added “What we’re going to do from here, I’ll go back and try to get as much information as I possibly can and go from there.”

Benson was arrested for driving while intoxicated in Austin, Texas, on June 7, 2008. While returning from a restaurant with his girlfriend, police claimed that Benson drove through a red light, and failed a field sobriety test. Police claimed he later refused to take a breath or blood test to determine his blood alcohol level. Police proceeded to detain Benson, and later released him on bond. Benson denied the police officers' allegations and insisted that he "aced" the field test. Bears general manager Jerry Angelo commented, "It's unfortunate. Disappointment is too much an often used word when we're talking about Cedric. The No. 1 lesson for every player is protect your job. We're all held accountable for our actions. I'm not going to say any more than that until we know for sure what the facts are." On the following Monday, Benson was waived from the Bears. Angelo commented on the release, stating ”Cedric displayed a pattern of behavior we will not tolerate... As I said this past weekend, you have to protect your job. Everyone in this organization is held accountable for their actions."

Benson was later ordered by a county judge to put a built-in ignition interlock breathalyzer in his car. He was also told to start drug counseling classes. Benson was cleared of all charges in September, after appearing before two grand juries in Travis County.

2010 arrest
On June 29, 2010, Benson was arrested for assault with injury after reportedly punching a bartender in the face. Benson himself denied committing the crime. Almost a month after the ordeal, the NFL announced that Benson would not be suspended.

2011 arrest
On July 17, 2011, Benson was arrested in Austin, Texas, for a misdemeanor charge of assault causing bodily injury to a family member. He was sentenced to 20 days in jail and ordered to pay a $4,000 fine. Benson was released from jail on September 3, after only five days of his sentence. He received a one-game suspension, enacted in week 8.

2017 arrest
On February 18, 2017, Benson was charged with driving while intoxicated in downtown Austin, Texas. According to court documents, Benson refused to take a field sobriety test and could not recite the alphabet from G to Z nor count past the number 3. Benson was released on the same day after posting bond.

Death and legacy
On August 17, 2019, Benson and a female passenger, Dr. Aamna Najam, were killed when his motorcycle crashed with a minivan on RM 2222 in Austin, Texas. Benson and the woman were pronounced dead at the scene, and two passengers in the minivan were not seriously injured.

On the two year anniversary of Benson’s death, his family and the Austin Independent School District launched a mentorship program in his honor at Gus Garcia Young Men’s Leadership Academy.

See also
List of NCAA Division I FBS running backs with at least 50 career rushing touchdowns
List of NCAA major college football yearly scoring leaders
List of Texas Longhorns football All-Americans
List of Chicago Bears first-round draft picks
List of people diagnosed with coeliac disease

References

External links

Cincinnati Bengals bio

1982 births
2019 deaths
American football running backs
Chicago Bears players
Cincinnati Bengals players
Green Bay Packers players
Gulf Coast Dodgers players
Texas Longhorns football players
People from Midland, Texas
Players of American football from Austin, Texas
Baseball players from Austin, Texas
African-American players of American football
African-American baseball players
Burials at Texas State Cemetery
Road incident deaths in Texas
Motorcycle road incident deaths
20th-century African-American people
21st-century African-American sportspeople
Ed Block Courage Award recipients